Lost Squadron may refer to:

The Lost Squadron, 1932 American action film
Flight 19, five United States Navy aircraft that disappeared over the Bermuda Triangle in 1945